İsfendiyar may refer to:

İsfendiyar Bey
Isfendiyar Principality
İsfendiyar Mountains
Isfendiyar, a spelling variant of Esfandiyār, a legendary Persian hero

See also
Esfandiyār (disambiguation)